Parataxis is a literary technique, in writing or speaking, that favors short, simple phrases, often without the use of conjunctions.

Parataxis or paratactic may also refer to:
Parataxis (politics), a term used in Greek politics
Paratactic lines, equidistant lines in elliptic geometry
Parataxis (military formation), devised by Alexios I Komnenos

See also 

Parataxic distortion